Craig Allen Darby (born September 26, 1972) is an American former professional ice hockey center who played in the National Hockey League (NHL) with the Montreal Canadiens, New York Islanders, Philadelphia Flyers and New Jersey Devils.

Playing career
Darby was drafted in the second round (43rd overall) of the 1991 NHL Entry Draft by the Montreal Canadiens. Darby entered into the NHL in 1994, following a successful time playing with Providence College in the NCAA and a season with the Fredericton Canadiens of the AHL, playing 10 games and registering two assists. That same season Darby was traded to the New York Islanders in a package along with Kirk Muller and Mathieu Schneider in exchange for Pierre Turgeon and Vladimir Malakhov, playing three more games in the 1994–95 season. On June 4, 1996, Darby was claimed off waivers by the Philadelphia Flyers after he spent most of the 1995–96 season in the AHL with the Worcester IceCats.

In 1998, he was claimed by the Nashville Predators in the expansion draft, but returned to the Montreal Canadiens in 1999 as a free agent without playing a game with Nashville. There he enjoyed his two best NHL seasons, playing 154 games and registering 45 points in the 1999–2000 and 2000–01 seasons, before leaving for the New Jersey Devils as a free agent after playing the 2001–02 season with Quebec of the AHL. Again Darby was unable to consistently remain in the NHL, playing just 5 games over the next two seasons before leaving the Devils and signing as a free agent with the Tampa Bay Lightning, who traded him to the Vancouver Canucks for Future Considerations. After 2006, Darby finished his career in Europe with Augsburger Panther of the DEL in Germany and HC TWK Innsbruck in Austria.

Career statistics

Regular season and playoffs

International

Awards and honors

External links
 

1972 births
Albany River Rats players
American men's ice hockey centers
Augsburger Panther players
Fredericton Canadiens players
HC TWK Innsbruck players
Ice hockey players from New York (state)
Living people
Manitoba Moose players
Milwaukee Admirals (IHL) players
Montreal Canadiens draft picks
Montreal Canadiens players
New Jersey Devils players
New York Islanders players
People from Oneida, New York
Philadelphia Flyers players
Philadelphia Phantoms players
Providence Friars men's ice hockey players
Quebec Citadelles players
Springfield Falcons players
Worcester IceCats players